Captina Island is an island on the Ohio River in Marshall County, West Virginia, United States. Powhatan Point, Ohio is located on the opposite shore from Captina Island. It lies at the southern end of Round Bottom with a stream-like channel separating the island from the West Virginia shore. Captina Island was once the place where watermelons were grown for the Marshall County Fair. It is part of the Ohio River Islands National Wildlife Refuge.

See also
List of islands of West Virginia

References

River islands of West Virginia
Landforms of Marshall County, West Virginia
Islands of the Ohio River